Then and Now  is a live album by British progressive rock band Emerson, Lake & Palmer, released in 1998.

It brings together two separate periods of the band's career and places them back-to-back. First is the legendary California Jam performance (the "Then"), which took place at the Ontario Motor Speedway in Ontario, California on 6 April 1974. Second a collection of recordings from the 1997 to 1998 reunion tour (the "Now").

Most of the band's best-known pieces are present, with "Karn Evil 9: First Impression, Part 2", "Take a Pebble" and "Lucky Man" appearing twice, as part of each period's set lists.

Notable inclusions are "A Time and a Place" from Tarkus, which hadn't been performed live prior to the 1998 tour, and an abbreviated version of King Crimson's "21st Century Schizoid Man", in the arrangement Emerson, Lake & Palmer recorded for The Return of the Manticore in 1993.



Track listing
Disc 1 

(Then - Cal Jam '74):
"Toccata" (Alberto Ginastera, arr. by Keith Emerson) – 3:36
"Take a Pebble Excerpts:" – 18:21
"Still...You Turn Me On" (Greg Lake)
"Lucky Man" (Lake)
"Piano Improvisations"
"Fugue" (Emerson, Friedrich Gulda)
"Little Rock Getaway" (Joe Sullivan)
"Karn Evil 9:" – 19:36
"1st Impression, Pt. 2" (Emerson, Lake)
"3rd Impression" (Emerson, Lake)
(Now - Tour '97/'98):
"A Time and a Place" (Emerson, Lake, Carl Palmer) – 4:06
"Piano Concerto No. 1, Third Movement: Toccata con Fuoco" (Emerson) – 4:51
"From the Beginning" (Lake) – 4:14

Disc 2

(Now - Tour '97/'98 continued):
"Karn Evil 9: 1st Impression, Pt. 2" (Emerson, Lake) – 5:22
"Tiger in a Spotlight" (Emerson, Lake, Palmer, Peter Sinfield) – 3:36
"Hoedown" (Aaron Copland) – 4:55
"Touch and Go" (Emerson, Lake) – 4:13
"Knife-Edge" (Emerson, Richard Fraser, Leoš Janáček, Lake) – 6:11
"Bitches Crystal" (Emerson, Lake) – 4:30
"Honky Tonk Train Blues" (Meade "Lux" Lewis) – 3:41
"Take a Pebble" (Lake) – 7:09
"Lucky Man" (Lake) – 5:05
"Fanfare for the Common Man/Rondo" (Dave Brubeck, Copland, arr. Emerson, Lake, Palmer) – 22:10
"21st Century Schizoid Man/America" (Robert Fripp, Michael Giles, Lake, Ian McDonald, Sinfield, Leonard Bernstein, Stephen Sondheim) – 4:53

Personnel

Band members
Keith Emerson – keyboards, Hammond organ, Yamaha GX-1, Modular Moog, Minimoog, classical piano, upright piano, electric piano, clavinet, Moog Lyra, Moog Apollo
Greg Lake – bass, electric and acoustic guitars, vocals
Carl Palmer – drums, electronic and acoustic percussions, gongs, tubular bells

Release details
1998, UK, Eagle EDGCD040, Release date 24 November 1998, CD
2006, UK, Sanctuary SMDDD343, Release date 5 June 2006, CD
2006, UK, Demon Music Group LTD MCDLX036, renamed Pomp And Ceremony Live 2006, CD

References

Emerson, Lake & Palmer live albums
1998 live albums